The quantum rotor model is a mathematical model for a quantum system. It can be visualized as an array of rotating electrons which behave as rigid rotors that interact through short-range dipole-dipole magnetic forces originating from their magnetic dipole moments (neglecting Coulomb forces). The model differs from similar spin-models such as the Ising model and the Heisenberg model in that it includes a term analogous to kinetic energy.

Although elementary quantum rotors do not exist in nature, the model can describe effective degrees of freedom for a system of sufficiently small number of closely coupled electrons in low-energy states.

Then, we can define rotor momentum  by the commutation relation of components 

However, it is found convenient to use rotor angular momentum operators  defined (in 3 dimensions) by components 

Then, the magnetic interactions between the quantum rotors, and thus their energy states, can be described by the following Hamiltonian:

where  are constants.. The interaction sum is taken over nearest neighbors, as indicated by the angle brackets. For very small and very large , the Hamiltonian predicts two distinct configurations (ground states), namely "magnetically" ordered rotors and disordered or "paramagnetic" rotors, respectively.

The interactions between the quantum rotors can be described by another (equivalent) Hamiltonian, which treats the rotors not as magnetic moments but as local electric currents.

Properties
One of the important features of the rotor model is the continuous O(N) symmetry, and hence the corresponding continuous symmetry breaking in the magnetically ordered state.

using the correspondence 

The particular case of quantum rotor model which has the O(2) symmetry can be used to describe a superconducting array of Josephson junctions or the behavior of bosons in optical lattices. Another specific case of O(3) symmetry is equivalent to a system of two layers (bilayer) of a quantum Heisenberg antiferromagnet; it can also describe double-layer quantum Hall ferromagnets. It can also be shown that the phase transition for the two dimensional rotor model has the same universality class as that of antiferromagnetic Heisenberg spin models.

See also
Heisenberg model (quantum)
Ising model

References

Spin models